Kraison Panjaroen (born June 15, 1986) is a retired professional footballer from Thailand. He and won the league title in 2006, as well as having experience of the Asian Champions League in 2007. He moved onto Chonburi in the middle of the 2008 season.

International career

Kraison has been a member of the Full Thailand National team on a number of occasions but has so far failed to make the 16 man cut for matchday selections.

Honours

Club
Bangkok University 
 Thailand Premier League Champions (1) : 2006

Chonburi
 Kor Royal Cup winner (1) : 2008

External links
 goal.com 
 

1986 births
Living people
Kraison Panjaroen
Kraison Panjaroen
Association football forwards
Kraison Panjaroen
Kraison Panjaroen
Kraison Panjaroen
Kraison Panjaroen
Kraison Panjaroen
Kraison Panjaroen
Kraison Panjaroen
Kraison Panjaroen
Kraison Panjaroen
Footballers at the 2006 Asian Games
Kraison Panjaroen